Pluramycin A is an antibiotic/anticancer compound that inhibits nucleic acid biosynthesis.  The pluramycin family of natural products are an important group of complex C-aryl glycoside antibiotics that possess the tetracyclic 4H-anthra[1,2-b]pyran-4,7,12-trione moiety A–D as an aromatic core. The D-ring is adorned with two deoxyaminosugars that are appended by C-aryl glycosidic linkages. The E-ring sugar is angolosamine, a carbohydrate that is also found in the antibiotic angolamycin. The F-ring sugar is the N,N-dimethyl derivative of vancosamine, which is the sugar found in the glycopeptide antibiotic vancomycin.

These compounds exhibit in vitro antitumor activity by DNA alkylation, where the two proximal amino sugars, D-angolosamine and N,N-dimethyl-L-vancosamine, play a key role in sequence recognition in intercalation of the tetracyclic chromophore.

References

Antibiotics
Angucyclines
Heterocyclic compounds with 4 rings
Epoxides
Acetate esters